Jordan Joseph (born 31 July 2000) is a French rugby union player. His position is in the back row and he currently plays for Pau on loan from Racing 92 in the Top 14.

Honours

International 
 France (U20)
World Rugby Under 20 Championship winners (2): 2018, 2019

Individual
World Rugby Junior Player of the Year: 2018

References

External links
Racing 92 profile
L'Équipe profile

2000 births
Living people
People from Gonesse
French rugby union players
Racing 92 players
Section Paloise players
Rugby union number eights
Sportspeople from Val-d'Oise